Ellingson may refer to:

Places
 Ellingson, South Dakota, a ghost town in the U.S.A.
 Ellingson Farm District, an historic farm in North Dakota, U.S.A.

People
 Amy Ellingson, American contemporary artist
 Evan Ellingson (born 1988), American actor
 Greg Ellingson (born 1988), Canadian football wide receiver
 Lindsay Ellingson (born  1984), American fashion model
 Mark W. Ellingson (1905–1993), 5th president of the Rochester Institute of Technology
 Mary Ross Ellingson (1906–1993), classical archaeologist
 Robert L. Ellingson (born 1950), American lawyer and politician
 Caylor Ellingson (2004 or 2003-2022), American North Dakota teenager, victim of homicide